The 1985–1988 Rugby League World Cup involved players from the national rugby league football teams of five countries: Australia, France, Great Britain, New Zealand and Papua New Guinea. As the World Cup was played over four years during normal international tours, these groups of players never assembled in one place as an entire squad.

Australia
Coaches:  Terry Fearnley (1985)  Don Furner (1986–88)  
Garry Jack  
John Ribot  
Dale Shearer
Andrew Ettingshausen
Andrew Farrar
Mark McGaw
Michael O'Connor  
Peter Jackson
Tony Currie
John Ferguson  
Steve Ella 
Gene Miles  
Alan Langer
Mal Meninga 
Chris Mortimer  
Les Kiss  
Wally Lewis(C)  
Des Hasler  
Steve Roach 
Peter Tunks 
Royce Simmons 
Gavin Miller
David Gillespie
Martin Bella
Greg Conescu
Paul Sironen  
Bryan Niebling   
Paul Vautin 
Peter Wynn  
Noel Cleal  
Paul Dunn 
Benny Elias  
Sam Backo
Wally Fullerton-Smith
Gary Belcher
Chris Close  
Peter Sterling
Royce Simmons
Greg Dowling  
Wayne Pearce 
Steve Folkes
Bob Lindner  
Les Davidson
Terry Lamb

France
Coaches:  Tas Baitieri and  Guy Vigouroux
Gilles Dumas (Saint-Gaudens) - Fullback
Jean-Philippe Pougeau (Saint-Estève) - Fullback
Patrick Wosniak (Saint-Estève) - Fullback
Guy Delaunay (Saint-Estève) - Centre
David Fraisse (Le Pontet) - Fullback/Centre/Wing/Five-eights
Jacques Moliner (Lézignan) - Lock forward
Frédéric Bourrel (Carcassonne)
Sébastien Rodriguez (XIII Catalan)
Serge Pallarès (XIII Catalan)
Mathieu Khedimi (Saint-Estève) - Hooker/Lock forward
Pierre Ailleres (Toulouse) - Prop
Alain Maury (Villeneuve)
Philippe Fourquet (Toulouse) - Wing
Daniel Divet (Carcassonne) - Second row
Francis Laforgue (XIII Catalan) - Centre/Five-eights
Pascal Laroche (Villeneuve) - Wing
Hugues Ratier (Lézignan) - Centre/Winger
Patrick Entat (Avignon) - Scrum-half
Cyril Pons (Saint-Gaudens) - Winger
Denis Bergé (Le Pontet) - Centre
Roger Palisses (Saint-Estève) - Centre/Winger
Didier Couston (Le Pontet) - Winger
Christian Scicchitano (Carpentras)
Dominique Espugna (Lézignan) - Five-eights
Patrick Baco (XIII Catalan) - Hooker
Yannick Mantese (Nantes XIII) - Hooker
Marc Palanques (Le Pontet) - Second row
Bruno Guasch (XIII Catalan) - Lock forward
Max Chantal (Villeneuve) - Prop
Thierry Bernabé (Le Pontet) - Lock forward
Serge Titeux (Le Pontet) - Prop
Marc Tisseyre (Pamiers)
Pierre Montgaillard (XIII Catalan)
Patrick Rocci (Le Pontet) - Five-eights
Guy Laforgue (XIII Catalan) - Second row (C)
Daniel Verdès (Villeneuve)
Philippe Gestas (Saint-Gaudens)
Yves Storer (Saint-Gaudens)
André Perez (XIII Catalan)
Jean-Luc Rabot (Villeneuve)

Great Britain
Coach:  Maurice Bamford/  Malcolm Reilly
Mick Burke
Steve Hampson
Des Drummond
Martin Offiah
Mark Forster
Phil Ford
Paul Loughlin
David Stephenson
Chris Burton
Garry Schofield
Jeff Grayshon
David Watkinson
Kevin Ward
John Fieldhouse
Lee Crooks
Andy Goodway
Tony Myler
Paul Groves
Brian Case
Roy Haggerty
Paul Medley
David Hulme
Paul Hulme
Shaun Edwards
Mike Gregory
Kevin Beardmore
David Hobbs
Ian Potter
Harry Pinner (C)
Lee Crooks
Chris Arkwright
Keith England
Gary Connolly
David Creasser
John Woods
Karl Fairbank
Paul Dixon

New Zealand
Coach:  Graham Lowe/ Tony Gordon
Gary Mercer
Gary Kemble
Tony Iro
Kevin Iro
Dean Bell
Gary Prohm
Mark Elia
Gary Freeman
A'au James Leuluai
Dane O'Hara
Peter Brown 
Olsen Filipaina
Clayton Friend
Wayne Wallace
Fred Ah Kuoi
Adrian Shelford
Ron O'Regan
Brent Todd
Owen Wright
Mark Horo
Howie Tamati
Kevin Tamati
Darrell Williams
Mark Graham (C)
Barry Harvey
Kurt Sorensen
Hugh McGahan
Shane Cooper
Sam Stewart
Joe Ropati
Ricky Cowan

Papua New Guinea
Coach:  Barry Wilson/  Skerry Palanga
Dairi Kovae
Ipisa Wanega
Joe Katsir
Lauta Atoi
Bal Numapo
Mafu Kerekere
Darius Haili
Mea Morea
Tony Kila (C)
Joe Tep
Roy Heni
Ati Lomutopa
Bobby Ako
Isaac Rop
Michael Matmillo
Yer Bom
Bernard Waketsi
Mathias Kambra
Arebo Taumaku
Gideon Kouoru
Tuiyo Evei
Haoda Kouoru
Thomas Rombuk
Ngala Lapan
Kepi Saea
Noah Andy
Daroa Ben-Moide
Arnold Krewanty
David Gauis
Mathias Kitimun
Joe Gispe
Andrew Kuno
Sam Karara

External links
World Cup 1985-1988 at Rugby League Project

1985 in rugby league
1986 in rugby league
1987 in rugby league
1988 in rugby league
Squads
Rugby League World Cup squads